Rasivere may refer to several places in Estonia:

Rasivere, Harju County, village in Anija Parish, Harju County
Rasivere, Lääne-Viru County, village in Vinni Parish, Lääne-Viru County